Private Scandal is a 1934 American pre-Code comedy film directed by Ralph Murphy and written by Vera Caspary, Garrett Fort and Bruce Manning. The film stars ZaSu Pitts, Phillips Holmes, Mary Brian, Ned Sparks, Lew Cody, June Brewster and Harold Waldridge. The film was released on May 11, 1934, by Paramount Pictures.

The film's sets were designed by the art director David S. Garber.

Plot

Cast
ZaSu Pitts as Miss Coates 
Phillips Holmes as Cliff Barry
Mary Brian as Fran Somers
Ned Sparks as Inspector Riordan
Lew Cody as Benjamin J. Somers
June Brewster as Adele Smith
Harold Waldridge as Jerome
Jed Prouty as H.R. Robbins
Charles Sellon as Mr. Terwilliger
Rollo Lloyd as Insurance Agent Henry Lane 
Olive Tell as Deborah Lane
Olin Howland as Ed
John Qualen as Schultz (uncredited)

References

External links 
 

1934 films
American comedy films
1934 comedy films
Paramount Pictures films
Films directed by Ralph Murphy
American black-and-white films
1930s English-language films
Films with screenplays by Garrett Fort
1930s American films